Lepidoneiva is a genus of moths in the subfamily Arctiinae. It contains the single species Lepidoneiva erubescens, which is found in Brazil (São Paulo).

References

Natural History Museum Lepidoptera generic names catalog

Arctiinae